Lina Stančiūtė (born 7 February 1986) is a Lithuanian former tennis player.

In her career, she won four singles titles and three doubles titles on the ITF Women's Circuit. On 28 September 2009, she reached her best singles ranking of world No. 197. On 15 May 2006, she peaked at No. 138 in the doubles rankings.

Playing for Lithuania Fed Cup team, Stančiūtė has a win–loss record of 37–31.

Personal life
Lina Stančiūtė was born on 7 February 1986 in Vilnius, Lithuania. She started playing tennis at age eight, her favourite surface is clay. In June 2016, she married Lithuanian professional Basketball player Martynas Gecevičius.

Career
Stančiūtė had a successful junior career, winning one ITF singles and doubles titles. Her career-high world ranking as a junior was world No. 63, and she finished her junior career with a record of 72–49.

In 2003, she reached her first ITF Circuit singles final, winning in Italy. She also reached two ITF doubles finals. In 2004, she won the tournament in Lafayette, United States, endowed with $25k, by beating Karolina Kosińska in three sets.

In July 2015, Stančiūtė announced her retirement from professional tennis.

ITF finals

Singles (4–1)

Doubles (3–4)

References

External links
 
 
 

1986 births
Living people
Sportspeople from Vilnius
Lithuanian female tennis players